Gordon Green (born November 26, 2001) is a retired American ice dancer.  Skating with his sister Caroline Green, he placed in the top six at the 2018 World Junior Championships and won the 2019 U.S. national junior title.

Personal life 
Gordon Green was born on November 26, 2001, in Washington, D.C. His mother, Mary, is a forensic scientist and his father, Richard, is a periodontist. He is the older brother of Caroline Green. He attended Julius West Middle School before enrolling at Richard Montgomery High School in Rockville, Maryland.

Career

Early years 
Green began learning to skate in 2009 because he was interested in playing ice hockey. He teamed up with his sister in August 2009 and joined the Wheaton Ice Skating Academy in September. The siblings took gold in the juvenile category at the 2013 U.S. Championships and won the intermediate title at the 2014 edition.

At the 2015 and 2016 U.S. Championships, the Greens took gold in the novice category. They then moved up to the junior level domestically and placed fifth at the 2017 U.S. Championships.

2017–2018 season 
Having become age-eligible for junior international events, the Greens made their ISU Junior Grand Prix (JGP) debut, winning bronze in Riga, Latvia, and Gdańsk, Poland. They finished as third alternates for the JGP Final.

In January, they took silver at the 2018 U.S. Championships, scoring 12.46 points less than champions Christina Carreira / Anthony Ponomarenko, and were assigned to the 2018 World Junior Championships in Sofia. In Bulgaria, the siblings ranked fifth in the short dance, seventh in the free dance, and sixth overall.

2018–2019 season 
The Greens withdrew from their JGP assignments due to Caroline's illness. Returning to competition, they won junior gold medals at the 2018 Golden Spin of Zagreb in December and at the Toruń Cup in early January. At the 2019 U.S. Championships, they outscored Avonley Nguyen / Vadym Kolesnik by 1.48 points to become national junior champions.

The Greens concluded the season at the 2019 World Junior Championships.  In the rhythm dance, Caroline stumbled during the tango pattern dance segment, leading to an eighth-place finish.  They improved in the free dance, moving up to seventh place.  Following the end of the competitive season, Gordon opted to retire from competitive ice dance to focus on academics.  Caroline subsequently formed a new partnership with Michael Parsons.

Programs 
(with Caroline Green)

Competitive highlights 
JGP: Junior Grand Prix

References

External links 
 

2001 births
American male ice dancers
Living people
Figure skaters from Washington, D.C.